Putino is a rural locality (a passing loop) in Vereshchaginsky District, Perm Krai, Russia. The population was 3 as of 2010.

Geography 
Putino is located 16 km west of Vereshchagino (the district's administrative centre) by road. Denisovka is the nearest rural locality.

References 

Rural localities in Vereshchaginsky District